The Islamic Coalition Party (ICP) is a conservative political party in Iran that favors economic liberalism.

The party is the pivotal organization within Front of Followers of the Line of the Imam and the Leader and is considered a lay ally of the influential Combatant Clergy Association. Though still very active and influential, the organization experienced a gradual elimination from political power after rise of new conservative rivals in the 2000s and some analysts dismiss it as something of a dinosaur heading for extinction.

One of the oldest among the active parties in Iran, it represents older generations of
conservatives and its main base of support is among bazaari merchants and shopkeepers in Grand Bazaar of Tehran and other cities, petite bourgeoisie and traditionalist clerics. It is probably the only political organization in Iran which possesses an organic relation with such a social base.

Since 1979, the party members have held high government offices and are influential players in the economy of Iran, dominating Iran Chamber of Commerce Industries and Mines (ICCIM) and having "a say in the appointment of the minister of commerce". The party has also interactions with Mostazafan Foundation, Imam Khomeini Relief Foundation and Mashhad-based Astan Quds Razavi.

The party has affiliated parochial schools for boys and girls.

History 
It played a vital role in the success of the Iranian Revolution. Following the revolution, it reduced its activities many members joined the Islamic Republic Party as leading members, resuming its activities after the latter's dissolution in 1987. The party had some 90 parliamentary seats in 2006, according to Mohsen Sazegara.

International affairs 
Islamic Coalition Party has an office for its international affairs headed by Mehdi Soli, succeeding Hamidreza Taraghi. The party held a forum on unity of Islamic parties in 2015, participated by Hezbollah among others. It sent congratulations to the 12th National Congress of the Communist Party of Vietnam and also maintains good relationships with the Communist Party of China, as well as the Workers' Party of Korea and government of North Korea.

Party leaders

Notes

References

External links

 
1963 establishments in Iran
Political parties established in 1963
Principlist political groups in Iran
Political parties of the Iranian Revolution
Khomeinist groups
Far-right political parties
Right-wing parties
Militant opposition to the Pahlavi dynasty